Corporación Financiera Alba is a Spanish investment holding company founded in 1986 and listed on the Continuous Market of the Spanish stock exchanges.

The company is part of the March Group, one of Spain's leading private family-owned business and financial groups, which also includes Banca March and the Juan March Foundation.

As of March 31, 2021, Corporación Financiera Alba's net asset value amounted to 4609 million euros.

History 

Corporación Financiera Alba has its origins in Cementos Alba, a Spanish cement company controlled by the March Group, which began manufacturing cement in the 1950s. In 1986, Hornos Ibéricos, also a cement company whose majority shareholder was the Holderbank group (now Holcim Ltd), acquired its cement plants and concrete subsidiaries.

As a result of the sale of these industrial assets, Cementos Alba changed its name to Corporación Financiera Alba and used the proceeds from the divestment to become a financial holding company with a diversified portfolio of holdings in industrial and service companies.

Some of Corporación Financiera Alba's most representative investments, excluding the current ones, have been:

 Airtel, later Vodafone
 Banco Urquijo
 Carrefour
 Cerveza San Miguel
 Ginés Navarro, later ACS
 Uralita Group
 Pryca hypermarkets
 Media Planning Group, later Havas
 Simago
 PRISA TV

Investment areas 

In accordance with its bylaws, Corporación Financiera Alba's investments are not restricted by geographic area, sector or type of financial asset. At present, its investments can be grouped into three categories:

Holdings in listed companies 

The companies in Corporación Financiera Alba are Spanish companies that derive a substantial part of their revenues from their international activities. Its shareholdings are always minority stakes but are significant enough to give it access to the management bodies of the companies in which it invests.

Listed companies in which Corporación Financiera Alba is a shareholder:

Development capital (unlisted companies) 

Corporación Financiera Alba managed -until January 2022- several investments through the private equity company Deyá Capital (62.5% owned by Alba), which has now been dissolved
.

The holding company's investment portfolio includes:

Real estate assets 

Corporación Financiera Alba's real estate investments consist primarily of office buildings located in prime areas in the center and outskirts of Madrid and Barcelona, with a total surface area of more than 80,000 m².

The Company focuses on operating its own properties on a rental basis.

Significant shareholders 

Source: CNMV (January 2020)

Board of Directors

Notes

References

External links

 Corporación Financiera Alba official website
 Banca March website
 Juan March foundation website

Companies of Spain
Companies established in 1986
Holding companies